Veitshöchheim is a municipality in the district of Würzburg, in Bavaria, Germany. Veitshöchheim has a population just under 10,000. It includes two villages: Veitshöchheim and Gadheim

Attractions

Schloss Veitshöchheim
:de:Schloss Veitshöchheim is located in the town. This summer palace of the Prince-Bishops of Würzburg was built in 1680–82, and was enlarged to its present appearance in 1753 by Balthasar Neumann. The gardens were redesigned for Prince-Bishop Adam Friedrich von Seinsheim (1755–1779), with lakes and waterworks, and filled with hundreds of allegorical sandstone sculptures from the workshops of the court sculptors Ferdinand Tietz and Johann Peter Wagner.

Infrastructure

Transport
Veitshöchheim has a railway station near the Schloss with a former royal pavilion.

Partner towns
  Rotava, Karlovy Vary Region, Czech Republic
  Pont-l'Évêque, Calvados, France

References

External links 

 

Würzburg (district)